Michael Pettersson (born 22 June 1956) is a Swedish equestrian. He competed in two events at the 1984 Summer Olympics.

References

External links
 

1956 births
Living people
Swedish male equestrians
Olympic equestrians of Sweden
Equestrians at the 1984 Summer Olympics
People from Kristianstad Municipality
Sportspeople from Skåne County
20th-century Swedish people